The Reform of the House of Commons Committee (known informally as the Wright Committee after its chair, Tony Wright) was a Select committee of the UK Parliament. It was established in 2009 to improve the procedures and relevance of Parliament. It reported on 12 November 2009 and made a number of recommendations, in a document entitled 'Rebuilding the House'.

These included
 Reduction in the number of committees and in the size of a standard departmental committee, possibly to eleven members
 Chairs of departmental and similar select committees should be directly elected by secret ballot of the House using the alternative vote
 Members of departmental and similar committees should be elected from within party groups by secret ballot
 Backbench business should be scheduled by the House rather than by Ministers
 The House should decide its sitting pattern for itself
 An effective e-petitions system should be introduced, including the possibility that members of the public might be able to compel an issue to be debated in the House
 One backbench motion per month should be routinely scheduled for debate

The general theme is that the House should have much more scope to choose and schedule its own activities. In May 2010, the incoming coalition Conservative and Liberal Democrat government agreed to bring forward the Wright Committee's recommendations in full.

References

External links 
Records for this Committee are held at the Parliamentary Archives

Defunct Select Committees of the British House of Commons
2009 establishments in the United Kingdom
Reform in the United Kingdom
2010 disestablishments in the United Kingdom